Hamilton Belal Green (born 9 November 1934) is a Guyanese politician who served as the fourth Prime Minister of Guyana. He is the first and only Muslim Prime Minister of Guyana, along with being the first and only Muslim Prime Minister in the Western Hemisphere. Green is an active trade unionist and active in politics since 1961. He was a member of People's National Congress (PNC) and chosen as one of the five Vice Presidents in the cabinet of Forbes Burnham in October 1980. He also served as the Prime Minister of Guyana from 6 August 1985 to 9 October 1992.

He was removed from office in 1992 when free and fair elections were held in Guyana under the direct supervision of President Jimmy Carter.

In March 1993, Green sued the People's National Congress for violation of his constitutional rights by expelling him from the party. Following this, he formed his own party, Good and Green Guyana (GGG).

Hamilton Green, who was born in Georgetown, Guyana, is also a former Mayor of Georgetown, in office from 1994 to 2016.

In 2003, he was one of the most prominent people to attend the Summit of World Leaders sponsored by Sun Myung Moon.
He is a member of the presiding council of the Universal Peace Federation

Notes

1934 births
Living people
Afro-Guyanese people
Guyanese Muslims
Mayors of places in Guyana
People from Georgetown, Guyana
People's National Congress (Guyana) politicians
Prime Ministers of Guyana
Vice presidents of Guyana